Abaxisotima is a genus of insects belonging to the family Tettigoniidae.

Species:

Abaxisotima acuminata 
Abaxisotima bicolor 
Abaxisotima brevifissa 
Abaxisotima forcipiforma 
Abaxisotima furca 
Abaxisotima macrocaudata 
Abaxisotima multipunctata 
Abaxisotima spiniforma

References

Tettigoniidae
Ensifera genera